Javad Khiabani (Persian: جواد خیابانی  ; born 28 October 1966), is an Iranian journalist, football commentator and television show host.  His parents are from Zanjan. He is an alumnus of Shahid Rajaee Teacher Training University. Khiabani commentated on the famous World Cup 1998 qualifier match between Iran and Australia in which Iran scored two late goals to earn an away 2–2 draw and qualify for the tournament at Australia's expense.

References

External links 
 جناب خان برای جواد خیابانی آهنگ آذری خواند at YJC

1966 births
Living people
People from Karaj
Iranian journalists
Iranian television personalities
People from Tehran
Iranian radio and television presenters